Scots College is an independent (private) Presbyterian school. It is located in the suburb of Strathmore Park, Wellington, New Zealand. Under the leadership of an Executive Headmaster, the College comprises three schools, the Preparatory School for Years 1 to 6, the Middle School for Years 7 to 9 and the Senior School for Years 11 to 13. Each school has its own Principal and Staff. Scots College is an IB World College.

History
It was founded as a Presbyterian boys' college in 1916 by Rev Dr James Gibb and the Hon John Aitken on the current campus of Queen Margaret College in Thorndon, and moved to the present site in Strathmore in 1920. Dr Gibb's vision was the creation of a Christian college that would be independent of the secular state system. It is the 'sister' school of Queen Margaret College in Thorndon, Wellington.

The college's Scots heritage is reflected in its ceremonies (often involving a piper leading a procession into its hall) and school song. College prefects wear kilts on official occasions and every Friday for chapel. The school tartan is that of the Clan Fergusson. Permission to wear the tartan was granted by the late Governor General Sir Charles Fergusson.

In 2020, the school began a transition to co-education with girls accepted for years 11 and 12. This will be extended to the remaining years in 2021-22.

The Main Block has a Category II listing with the New Zealand Historic Places Trust.

Houses

Students in the Middle and Senior Schools (Years 7–13) are organized into eight "houses". Each house reflects an important part of the people who have contributed to Scots College over its history. The houses have expanded three times since the founding of the school – two houses were added to the original two in 1961/1963, another two in 1993 with the boarders' house (Gibb) being removed at this time as well, and a further two added in 2009. There are major competitions in swimming, cross-country, music, athletics, and other weekly house sport games, such as hockey and touch rugby. The two original houses were Aitken (Blue, named in honour of founding father Hon John Aitken) and Fergusson (Green, named in honour of General Sir Charles Fergusson), with Glasgow (Red, named in honour of former Headmaster K W R Glasgow) and MacKenzie (Yellow, named in honour of Elsie MacKenzie, Former mistress of the Junios Department of Scots College) being established next, followed by Plimmer (Sky Blue, named in honour of the John Plimmer and his family, whose four grandchildren were enrolled as boarders in 1916) and Uttley (Black, named in honour of Scots College's first Headmaster Dr George Uttley) in 1993 and Smith (Navy Blue, in honour of Alexander Pringle Smith) and Mawson (Maroon, named in honour of Brigadier John Mawson, a past student and Scots College Old Boys' Association President) established in 2009.

The Preparatory School (Years 1–6) maintains four houses: Potatau (Blue), Bedding (Green), Macarthur (Red) and McKelvie (Yellow). In 2004 there was an announcement of a change to the current House names in the hopes of giving the Preparatory School a better sense of historical identity; Potatau named after the writer of the School haka, McKelvie named in honour of past parent and Board of Governors member Lynn McKelvie, Bedding names in honour of past student Geoff Bedding and Macarthur named after the first student at Scots College Ian Hannay Macarthur.

Campus facilities
Recent projects on campus have been the science block, opened in 2006 by Nobel Laureate Sir Paul Nurse and the Aitken (Admin/Reception) block in 2009. Other facilities updated in the last few years include the Leslie Shelly Lecture Theatre and the Information Centre, and an extension to Gibb House, the school's Boarding House. The Hodge Sports Centre (HSC) was opened on 4 November 2011, and the Creative Performing Arts Centre (CPAC) was opened on 2 March 2012.

Opened in 2012 is a purpose built Creative and Performing Arts Centre. The Creative and Performing Arts Centre provides a new Pipe Band facility, recording studio, Drama rooms, Music rooms, Middle School administration area, offices, Art and Graphics rooms.

The College introduced Flexible Learning environments to its campus during 2017 including a tertiary style 'Hub' offering flexible spaces for teaching, student collaboration and a common room for senior students. Additional new Boarding Houses were opened in 2015 and 2018 to house the growing number of boarding students.

Flexible Learning Environments have been introduced to the College over previous years. These spaces help facilitate collaboration and project based learning. They provide teachers and students with areas to learn in large and small groups, collaborate and break away for independent study.

The latest campus development is the McKinnon Block, named in honour of former Headmaster Ian McKinnon and his wife Jenny. Opened in 2020 by Her Excellency the Rt Hon Dame Patsy Reddy Governor General of New Zealand. Included in the building are facilities for Food Science to allow for its introduction to the curriculum. A fabrication lab with state of the art model and design equipment that brings us in alignment with leading NZ universities. The girls’ pastoral care facilities are also located in this block with their own tertiary style common room.

The school also has IB World School status and maintains an IB curriculum from PYP to Diploma. The current IB Diploma co-ordinator is Mike McKnight and the MYP co-ordinator is Kate Bondett.

Boarding

The boarding house (titled Gibb House, after the founder of the school) has accommodation for approximately 130 students. The majority of these students are in Years 9–13 however allowance has been made occasionally for Year 7 and 8 students to board full-time. The current boarding director is Gary Henley-Smith, with assistant house masters Nick Sinnamon and Marc Capstick, and matrons Tania Steadman and Blossom Cameron. In addition, gap year tutors are lodged in the boarding house and assist with day-to-day operations.

Connections with other schools
Scots College 1st XV is currently playing in the Premier I rugby division. In 2014 the 1st XV won the NZ Secondary School Championship – a joint win with Hamilton Boys High School.  In 2015 they represented New Zealand at the SANIX Rugby Youth Cup tournament in Japan where they placed third.

Students competing for the 1st XV in traditional fixtures perform a special haka written by an old boy; this is distinct from the school haka.

Scots College is the brother school to the slightly younger Queen Margaret College, which now sites itself in the original Scots College building. Often there are various socials and sporting matches against local schools, organised by College Sport Wellington. In addition, both sections of the school have inter-school fixtures with other secondary schools, notably Lindisfarne and primary schools such as Huntley School.

Notable alumni

Steven Adams – basketball player for Memphis Grizzlies
Ashley Bloomfield – Doctor, Director-General of Health and "public face" of 2020 coronavirus pandemic in New Zealand
Prof Geoffrey Duncan Chisholm – surgeon
John Clarke – satirist
Lord Grey of Naunton – last Governor of Northern Ireland
Eugenio Pizzuto – footballer for Lille OSC
Stu Riddle – footballer
Euan Robertson – New Zealand distance runner
Sarpreet Singh – footballer for Bayern Munich II
Keegan Smith – footballer for Team Wellington FC
Oskar van Hattum footballer for Wellington Phoenix
Dr Jason Varuhas – Professor of Law at the University of Melbourne
Victor Vito – New Zealand Rugby Sevens international and All Black

Co-educational 
In August 2020 the Scots College Board of Governors announced the decision to move to a fully co-educational College from 2021. Accepting girls and boys in Years 1-13 (initially excluding Years 8 and 10). This change is part of the College's Future Focussed Learning Strategy and preparing students for their futures in an evolving world.

In January 2018, School Headmaster Graeme Yule announced that Scots College Senior School will become a co-educational school, meaning it will accept both girls and boys to enroll. The change will begin in 2020, when 60 Year 11 to 13 female students will join the Senior School and graduate as the first mixed-sex group from 2021. The integration would expand each year to a total of 150 girls by 2022.

Controversies
In November 2007, several final year students were banned from end-of-year prizes for growing moustaches as part of the fund-raising campaign
'Movember', established by The Movember Foundation, to raise awareness for prostate cancer. The college threatened to ban a senior student from their NCEA examinations (official secondary school qualification) for growing a moustache during November.

In September 2010, Scots College expelled seven students and suspended five for involvement in a drug ring within the college. Some involved in using and dealing the illegal substances were as young as 13.

In October 2013, ten Scots College students from Year 11 to 13, including prefects, were caught illegally consuming alcohol on a school trip to Fiji. School Headmaster Graeme Yule recognised the actions as 'relatively minor' and suspended students for less than a week.

In April 2019, Headmaster Graham Yule was accused of making "sexist" comments after he said prospective female students would not be allowed to "sit at the back of the class painting their nails" once the school becomes co-educational. He also commented on the importance women gave to the size of mirrors while talking about construction of the new girls' bathroom.

In May 2022, a non-teaching staff member of Scots College was accused of improper sexual behaviour. The member was immediately stood down and the staff member agreed to be put on leave. Police were contacted by a parent with the allegation, but charges were later ruled out.

References

External links
Official Website

Boarding schools in New Zealand
Educational institutions established in 1916
Secondary schools in the Wellington Region
Presbyterian schools in New Zealand
Schools in Wellington City
Scottish-New Zealand culture
International Baccalaureate schools in New Zealand
Heritage New Zealand Category 2 historic places in the Wellington Region
1916 establishments in New Zealand